A Concilium provinciae (Latin for 'Provincial council', known in Greek as a koinon) was an assembly of delegates from all the settlements and cities in a Roman province, which met once a year in the capital of the relevant region in order to celebrate a festival in honour of the goddess Roma, a divine personification of the Roman state. These festivities were led by a flamen, a priest, who was chosen annually by the assembly.

In addition to this ceremonial and religious aspect, the Concilium provinciae also provided a venue for the local aristocracy and political elite to deliberate on internal concerns and problems of the province or to choose delegations to communicate local concerns to Rome.

See also 
 Ara trium Galliarum - Provincial council of the Gallic provinces.
 Ara Ubiorum - Provincial council of the Germanic provinces

Bibliography 
 Jürgen Deininger: Die Provinziallandtage der römischen Kaiserzeit von Augustus bis zum Ende des dritten Jahrhunderts n. Chr. Beck, München 1965.
Provinces of the Roman Empire
Ancient Roman religion